Soil policy in Victoria refers to the policies of soil governance in the Australian state of Victoria. In a 10-year vision for the environment of Victoria which is spelled out in "Growing Victoria Together" (DPC, 2001), one of the goals is that "the condition of our land will improve as the impact of salinity and soil degradation is reduced". Complementing "Growing Victoria Together" is "Our Environment: Our Future", which is a framework for Victoria's environmental sustainability. This defines a "long term and integrated approach" that seeks to "maximise our future economic growth, maintain our quality of life and protect our unique Victorian environment". This is to be achieved by:
 maintaining and restoring natural assets
 using resources more efficiently
 reducing everyday environmental impacts

Within "Growing Victoria Together" and "Our Environment: Our Future" is the contemporary policy base for soils, one of the State's natural assets.

Victorian government agencies with policies implicating soil

Department of Sustainability and Environment
The Victorian Department of Sustainability and Environment (DSE) is responsible for promoting and managing the sustainability of the state's natural and built environments. Its 2006 Outcomes Framework provides a general sense of healthy and productive land. Its policy base must ensure that:
soils are managed for all their values (irrespective of either tenure or use)
soil values are retained for future generations
values derived from the soil are sustained and private interests do not compromise public interests

DSE is central to the development of "Our Environment: Our Future", and is influential through its partners in the implementation of this framework. Significantly, in 2007, it is co-ordinating the Victorian government's white paper "Land and biodiversity in a time of climate change". Being formative to new policy, it is significant that this paper clearly recognises the value of the state's soil asset, especially in terms of its contribution to ecosystem services and agricultural production.

Department of Primary Industries
The vision of the Department of Primary Industries (DPI) is "Growing our Future", which is compatible the state's 10-year vision "Growing Victoria Together". Its purpose is "sustainable development of primary industries", with objectives around: strong economic activity; high quality natural resources, long term, and; resilient industries and communities.

The soil policy position of DPI, with respect to agriculture and private forestry, is predicated on two requirements: 
healthy and productive lands to support sustainable production of "agricultural" goods and services, and
agricultural activities which do not compromise healthy and productive lands either now or for the future.

Catchment Management Authorities
The Victorian Catchment Management Authorities (CMAs) are established under the Catchment and Land Protection Act 1997. Each CMA oversees investment in regional natural resource sustainability by co-ordinating the development and implementation of a Regional Catchment Strategy (RCS) and an associated annual Regional Catchment Investment Plan (RCIP).

For example, in 2007, the North Central CMA is reviewing its RCS position on soil health. Soils are considered both as an asset providing services (such as agricultural production) and as an entity whose decline threatens associated assets (such as water quality). While the North Central region's RCS will continue to acknowledge the value of healthy soils, it is yet to be determined the extent to which limited environmental funds are spent on protecting the soil "asset", versus only investing in soil health to mitigate threats to higher-priority regional assets.

Environment Protection Authority
The purpose of the Victorian Environment Protection Authority (EPA) is to "protect, care for and improve our environment". The EPA is guided by an Environment Protection Board, which provides policy advice based on national and international trends in environmental protection. 

The EPA is interested in soils to the extent that it seeks to protect the beneficial uses of the land resources. Pollution control is its primary focus. Relevant legislation includes the Environment Protection Act 1970 and also, for example, the State Environmental Protection Policy (SEPP), Prevention and Management of Contamination of Land, and Industrial Waste Management Policy (IWMP), Waste Acid Sulfate Soils.

Local government
Local government in Victoria provides a range of services, including "property, economic, human, recreational and cultural services. Councils also enforce state and local laws relating to such matters as land use planning, environment protection, public health, traffic and parking, and animal management".

Local government may take an interest in soil health through its planning schemes, which describe the types of activities and developments that may occur in designated areas of the municipality; they may also establish relevant local laws. A positive example of local government acting in the interests of soil health is the joint approach of the Albury and Wodonga Councils (of NSW and VIC respectively) to address urban erosion and sedimentation. The Albury Wodonga Region Soil & Water Management Policy complemented by Erosion and Sediment Control Guidelines for Building Sites (estimated 2004) contain specific soil policy and codes of practice for the building industry.

See also
Environment of Australia
Soil science

References

 Department of Premier and Cabinet (DPC), 2007. Viewed July 2007. Accessible at http://www.dpc.vic.gov.au/CA256D8000265E1A/page/Growing+Victoria+Together!OpenDocument&1=30-Growing+Victoria+Together~&2=~&3=~

Land management in Australia
Australia
Australia
Environment of Victoria (Australia)